Rouvres may refer to several communes in France:

Rouvres, Calvados, in the Calvados département 
Rouvres, Eure-et-Loir, in the Eure-et-Loir département 
Rouvres, Seine-et-Marne, in the Seine-et-Marne département
Rouvres-en-Multien, in the Oise département
Rouvres-en-Plaine, in the Côte-d'Or département 
Rouvres-en-Woëvre, in the Meuse département 
Rouvres-en-Xaintois, in the Vosges département 
Rouvres-la-Chétive, in the Vosges département 
Rouvres-les-Bois, in the Indre département 
Rouvres-les-Vignes, in the Aube département 
Rouvres-Saint-Jean, in the Loiret département
Rouvres-sous-Meilly, in the Côte-d'Or département 
Rouvres-sur-Aube, in the Haute-Marne département